Crassispira angulosa is an extinct species of sea snail, a marine gastropod mollusk in the family Pseudomelatomidae, the turrids and allies.

Subspecies:  † Crassispira angulosa acyensis (A.E.M. Cossmann, 1889) (synonym: Drillia (Crassispira) angulosa acyensis Cossmann, 1889)

Description
The length of the shell attains 6.8 mm.

Distribution
Fossils have been found in Eocene strata in the Paris Basin, France.

References

 Cossmann (M.), 1896 – Essais de Paléoconchologie comparée (2ème livraison), p. 1–179
 Cossmann (M.), 1902 – Catalogue illustré des coquilles fossiles de l'Éocène des environs de Paris (3ème appendice). Annales de la Société royale Malacologique de Belgique, t. 36, p. 9–110
  Cossmann (M.) & Pissarro (G.), 1913 – Iconographie complète des coquilles fossiles de l'Éocène des environs de Paris, t. 2, p. pl. 46–65

External links
 MNHN: Drillia angulosa
 Pacaud J.M. & Le Renard J. (1995). Révision des Mollusques paléogènes du Bassin de Paris. IV- Liste systématique actualisée. Cossmanniana. 3(4): 151–187

angulosa
Gastropods described in 1834